Première vague ("First Wave") is a Canadian dramatic anthology film, which premiered in 2021. The first feature film ever produced by Kino Montréal, a filmmaking collective which otherwise specializes in short films, the film tells four interrelated stories about life in Montreal during the early days of the COVID-19 pandemic in 2020. The film was directed by Max Dufaud, Reda Lahmouid, Kevin T. Landry and Rémi Fréchette, with each of the directors writing and helming one of the four segments.

Daniel (Fayolle Jean Jr.), a delivery driver, becomes overwhelmed with work while caring for his sick father (Fayolle Jean). Fanny (Myranda Plourde), a young woman who has just recently moved to Montreal, finds herself becoming more fearful as her roommate ignores social distancing rules. Sex worker Marianne (Marie-Sophie Roy) watches her income dry up as her mother contracts COVID-19 in a nursing home. Samuel (Mathieu Lorain Dignard) slowly unravels in isolation after both losing his job and breaking up with his girlfriend. In addition to some interconnecting plot points between the four stories, the segments are also linked by footage of premier François Legault's real-life press conferences.

The film premiered on April 28, 2021 at the Rendez-vous Québec Cinéma, before opening commercially on May 14.

References

External links

2021 films
2021 drama films
Canadian drama films
Canadian anthology films
Films shot in Quebec
Films about the COVID-19 pandemic
French-language Canadian films
2020s Canadian films